Lenape is an unincorporated community in Leavenworth County, Kansas, United States.

History
Lenape was founded in 1867 on the main line of the Kansas Pacific Railroad. The community was named after the Lenape Indians. A post office was established at Lenape in 1868, and remained in operation until it was discontinued in 1943.
"McCoy labored with energy, zeal, and intelligence. Pine lumber was brought from Hannibal Missouri, and hard wood from Lenape, Kansas" to build Abilene so it could handle three thousand head of cattle (Webb pg 221).

References

Further reading

External links
 Leavenworth County maps: Current, Historic, KDOT

Unincorporated communities in Leavenworth County, Kansas
Unincorporated communities in Kansas